Achlysiella is a genus of nematodes belonging to the family Pratylenchidae.

The species of this genus are found in Australia  and Central America.

Species:

Achlysiella brevicaudata 
Achlysiella capitata 
Achlysiella magniglans 
Achlysiella trilineata 
Achlysiella vacua 
Achlysiella williamsi

References

Nematodes